Dromiidae is a family of crabs, often referred to as sponge crabs. They are small or medium-sized crabs which get their name from the ability to shape a living sponge into a portable shelter for themselves. A sponge crab cuts out a fragment from a sponge and trims it to its own shape using its claws. The last two pairs of legs are shorter than other legs and bend upward over the crab's carapace, to hold the sponge in place. The sponge grows along with the crab, providing a consistent shelter.

The family Dromiidae contains the following subfamilies and genera:

Dromiinae De Haan, 1833
Alainodromia McLay, 1998
Ameridromia † Blow & Manning, 1996
Ascidiophilus Richters, 1880
Austrodromidia McLay, 1993
Barnardomia McLay, 1993
Conchoecetes Stimpson, 1858
Costadromia †  Feldman and Schweitzer, 2019
Cryptodromia Stimpson, 1858
Cryptodromiopsis Borradaile, 1903
Desmodromia McLay, 2001
Dromia Weber, 1795
Dromidia Stimpson, 1858
Dromidiopsis Borradaile, 1900
Dromilites † H. Milne-Edwards, 1837
Epigodromia McLay, 1993
Epipedodromia André, 1932
Eudromidia Barnard, 1947
Exodromidia Stebbing, 1905
Foredromia McLay, 2002
Fultodromia McLay, 1993
Haledromia McLay, 1993
Hemisphaerodromia Barnard, 1954
Homalodromia Miers, 1884
Kerepesia † Müller, 1976
Kromtitis † Müller, 1984
Lamarckdromia Guinot & Tavares, 2003
Lamarckdromia beagle McLay, 2022
Lauridromia McLay, 1993
Lewindromia Guinot & Tavares, 2003
Lucanthonisia † Van Bakel, Artal, Fraaije & Jagt, 2009
Mclaydromia Guinot & Tavares, 2003
Metadromia McLay, 2009
Moreiradromia Guinot & Tavares, 2003
Noetlingia † Beurlen, 1928
Paradromia Balss, 1921
Petalomera Stimpson, 1858
Platydromia Brocchi, 1877
Pseudodromia Stimpson, 1858d
Speodromia Barnard, 1947
Stebbingdromia Guinot & Tavares, 2003
Sternodromia Forest, 1974
Stimdromia McLay, 1993
Takedromia McLay, 1993
Tumidodromia McLay, 2009
Tunedromia McLay, 1993
Hypoconchinae Guinot & Tavares, 2003
Hypoconcha Guérin-Méneville, 1854
Sphaerodromiinae Guinot & Tavares, 2003
Eodromia McLay, 1993
Frodromia McLay, 1993
Sphaerodromia Alcock, 1899

References

Dromiacea
Taxa named by Wilhem de Haan
Decapod families